Ian David Thompson  (1 September 1935 – 2 December 2009) was an Australian politician who served as Speaker of the Western Australian Legislative Assembly.

Thompson was born in Morawa and left school in year 8, working as a carpenter, fitter and mechanic. In 1971 he was elected as the Liberal member for Darling Range. He transferred to Kalamunda in 1974 and back to Darling Range in 1989. He held various shadow ministries during the 1980s. In the 1970s he was one of a group of Liberal MPs to oppose the closure of the Tresillian disabled children's home; Thompson claimed Premier Sir Charles Court blamed him for the party disunity. In 1977 Thompson was elected Speaker of the Western Australian Legislative Assembly, and was required to use his casting vote after the National Country Party withdrew its support for a government bill to limit the ability of illiterate people to vote. Thompson voted against the measure, leading Court to demand his resignation; Thompson refused and faced a censure motion in the Liberal Party room, which was defeated after Margaret McAleer called for unity. Thompson would eventually resign from the Liberal Party anyway, and he retired from politics in 1993 as an independent.

References

1935 births
2009 deaths
Liberal Party of Australia members of the Parliament of Western Australia
Independent members of the Parliament of Western Australia
Members of the Western Australian Legislative Assembly
Speakers of the Western Australian Legislative Assembly
Australian carpenters
Members of the Order of Australia
People from Morawa, Western Australia
20th-century Australian politicians